Oberfeld may refer to:
 Oberfeld (Winterthur), a quarter in Winterthur, Switzerland

People with the surname 
 Casimir Oberfeld (1903–1945), Polish-born French composer
 Harvey Oberfeld (born 1945), Canadian journalist